Vivian Hollowday, GC (13 October 1916 – 15 April 1977), sometimes known as Bob Hollowday, was a British recipient of the George Cross, the highest British award for gallantry not in the face of the enemy. He was the first non-commissioned member of the Royal Air Force (RAF) to receive this honour.

Hollowday attended Worksop College, a public school in North Nottinghamshire before joining the Royal Air Force at the start of the Second World War, in September 1939. He was a member of 14 Flying Training School, and of the Royal Air Force Volunteer Reserve. He was cremated and buried at Bedford Cemetery and Crematorium, Renhold, Bedfordshire, England.

Along with the George Cross, Hollowday was the recipient of the 1939–45 Star, Africa Star, Italy Star, France and Germany Star, the Defence Medal, War Medal 1939–1945, and was Mentioned in Despatches. As a recipient of the George Cross he also received the Queen Elizabeth II Coronation Medal in 1953 and the Queen Elizabeth II Silver Jubilee Medal in 1977.

George Cross
Then Aircraftman First Class Hollowday was awarded the George Cross for the "amazing courage and initiative" he showed in two attempted rescues of crashed RAF personnel, while based at RAF Cranfield. The first rescue attempt was on 2 July 1940, and the second on 27 August 1940. The following citation was printed in the London Gazette of 21 January 1941.

The pilot in the July crash was the only occupant of the plane. He was Sergeant Noel Francis Lloyd Davies and was 20 years old. He was buried in a private grave in his home town of Cleethorpes.

References

Royal Air Force airmen
British recipients of the George Cross
Royal Air Force recipients of the George Cross
Royal Air Force Volunteer Reserve personnel of World War II
1916 births
1977 deaths
People educated at Worksop College
People from the Borough of North Lincolnshire